The Kamil Crater is a  wide and  deep (original depth, a part covered by sand at present) meteorite impact crater in the East Uweinat Desert in southwestern New Valley Governorate, Egypt, Only  north of the border with the Sudan and  above sea level. It was located in 2008 using Google Earth satellite imagery by Vincenzo de Michele (former curator of the Museo Civico di Storia Naturale di Milan in Milan, Italy).

Studies
The first geophysical study of the Kamil Crater was conducted during an Italian-Egyptian expedition undertaken in February 2010 as part of the 2009 Egyptian-Italian Science Year (EISY) and proved the meteoritic origin of the crater. It is estimated to be less than 5,000 years old and shows a well-preserved rayed structure. The crater was produced by an iron meteorite that has been given an official name after the closest topographic feature in the area,  Gebel Kamil, and which fragmented into thousands of pieces upon impact with the sandstone bedrock. Meteor fragments totalling  were recovered during the geophysical expedition, the bulk of which are curated at the Egyptian Geological Museum in Cairo. Type specimens also are curated at the Museo Nazionale dell'Antartide at the University of Siena, and at the Museo di Storia Naturale at the University of Pisa.

Kamil Crater is located at 22° 1'5.89"N latitude and 26° 5'15.69"E longitude.

See also
Gebel Kamil (Meteorite)
2008 TC3

References

External links 
 Kamil Crater at Museo Nazionale Antartide
 Photo set on Flickr
 KMZ File for Google Earth showing the crater position.

Impact craters of Egypt
Holocene impact craters